Solomon Gbadegesin Ilori (born c. 1934) is a Nigerian drummer and percussionist who moved to New York City in 1958 and collaborated with jazz artists such as Art Blakey and Harry Belafonte before recording his debut album for Blue Note Records in 1963.

Biography
Solomon Gbadegesin Ilori was born in Nigeria into a musical family, and as a child learned to play the drums, guitar and flute. He moved to the US in 1958.

Discography

As leader
African High Life (Blue Note, 1963)

As sideman
With Art Blakey
The African Beat (Blue Note, 1962)

References

Nigerian male musicians
Nigerian songwriters
World music musicians
Blue Note Records artists
1930s births
Year of birth missing (living people)
Living people
Musicians from New York City
Nigerian emigrants to the United States
Male jazz musicians